Jean-Noël Laboiteuse (born 12 January 1977) is a Mauritian former international footballer who played as a midfielder. He won nine caps and scored one goal for the Mauritius national football team between 2002 and 2007.

References

1977 births
Living people
Mauritian footballers
Mauritius international footballers
Association football midfielders